More Neighbours Toronto is a Toronto-based YIMBY advocacy group that supports any policy change that increases the supply of housing. It has more than 200 active volunteers and drafts recommendations (e.g. city policy on garden suites), submits deputations to the city (e.g. for a "modular supportive housing development"), duputations to the province and attends public consultation meetings, all in an effort to push for more substantive housing development in the city.  It is a registered third party advertiser in Toronto elections, has endorsed city council candidates for elections and was the target of attack ads.

It was consulted by the Government of Ontario's 2021 Ontario Housing Affordability Task Force. With the Toronto Region Board of Trade, More Neighbours hosted a public consultation on the task force report at the University of Toronto's School of Cities. Panelists were the task force chair, Jake Lawrence, Bank of Nova Scotia, Tim Hudak, CEO of the Ontario Real Estate Association and Ene Underwood, CEO of Habitat for Humanity Greater Toronto Area.

It has been cited by The Globe and Mail'''s editorial board and its representatives have published op-eds in the Globe''. It is regularly consulted by media across the political spectrum in segments on housingincluding a segment where More Neighbours was cited to contrast with the Premier of Ontario. The leader of the official opposition, Andrea Horwath stated, "Thanks More Neighbours, for your leadership and advocacy!" More Neighbours has also collaborated with Greenpac and other civic groups to host debates in provincial elections.

More Neighbours has also been covered in Quebec.

References

External links
 

Housing associations